Hubat (Harari: ሆበት Hobät), also known as Hobat, or Kubat was a historical Muslim state located in present-day eastern Ethiopia. Hubat is today within a district known as Adare Qadima which includes Garamuelta and its surroundings in Oromia region. The area is 30 km north west of Harar city at Hubeta, according to historian George Huntingford. Trimingham locates it as the region between Harar and Jaldessa. Archaeologist Timothy Insoll considers Harla town to be Hubat the capital of the now defunct Harla Kingdom.

History

According to Dr. Lapiso, Hubat was one of the Islamic states that had developed in the Horn of Africa from the ninth to fourteenth centuries. In AD 1288 Sultan Wali Asma of the Ifat Sultanate invaded Hubat following collapse of the Maḥzūmī dynasty. Hubat was also invaded by Ethiopian Emperor Amda Seyon in the early 1300s. Hubat was an Ifat protectorate in the fourteenth century and an autonomous state within Adal Sultanate in the fifteenth century.

According to Mohammed Hassan Hubat was the stronghold of the Harla people and center of operations for fifteenth century Adal Emir Garad Abun Adashe. A siege of Hubat took place in the early sixteenth century led by the Adal Sultan Abu Bakr ibn Muhammad against rebel leader Garad Umar din. 

The notable sixteenth century ruler of Adal who conquered Abyssinia, Imam Ahmad ibn Ibrahim al-Ghazi was born in Hubat. In his early career Ahmed defeated an Abyssinian militia at the Battle of Hubat led by Degalhan a general of Emperor Dawit II. Ahmed Ibrahim also achieved a second stunning victory over an Abyssinian raiding party led by Fanuel in Hubat which gained him fame. Merid Wolde Aregay states the Hubat and Harla principalities demonstrated ability to defeat Abyssinians meant it was necessary to replace Sultan Badlay's descendants. Hubat would later play an important role for Ahmad ibn Ibrahim in his struggle against Adal Sultan Abu Bakr.

Hubat would be invaded and settled by the Barento Oromo in the following centuries who came at loggerheads with the Adal Sultanate.

Notable residents
Ahmed ibn Ibrahim al-Ghazi, Emir/Imam of Adal Sultanate
Abubaker Qecchin, general of the Adal Sultanate and chief of Hubat

See also
 Gidaya, neighboring state

References

Cities of the Adal Sultanate